The 2005 Tennessee Volunteers (variously "Tennessee", "UT", or the "Vols") represented the University of Tennessee in the 2005 NCAA Division I-A football season. Playing as a member of the Southeastern Conference (SEC) Eastern Division, the team was led by head coach Phillip Fulmer, in his thirteenth full year, and played their home games at Neyland Stadium in Knoxville, Tennessee. They finished the season with a record of five wins and six losses (5–6 overall, 3–5 in the SEC), and failed to qualify for a bowl game for the first time during Fulmer's tenure as head coach and the first time overall since 1988.

Tennessee entered their 2005 season ranked as the number three team in the nation and as a favorite to win the Eastern Division and compete for the SEC championship.

Schedule

Reference:
 As part of their penalty for NCAA violations, Alabama has retroactively vacated its 2005 victory over Tennessee. However, the penalty to vacate victories does not result in a loss (or forfeiture) of the affected game or award a victory to the opponent, therefore Tennessee still considers the game a loss in their official records.

Roster

Team players drafted into the NFL

References:

References
General

 

Specific

Tennessee
Tennessee Volunteers football seasons
Tennessee Volunteers football